The men's 400 metre freestyle competition at the 1999 Pan Pacific Swimming Championships took place on August 22 at the Sydney International Aquatic Centre.  The last champion was Grant Hackett of Australia.

This race consisted of eight lengths of the pool, with all eight being in the freestyle stroke.

Records
Prior to this competition, the existing world and Pan Pacific records were as follows:

Results
All times are in minutes and seconds.

Heats
The first round was held on August 22.

Final 
The final was held on August 22.

References

1999 Pan Pacific Swimming Championships